Eastmanosteus ("Eastman's bone") is a fossil genus of dunkleosteid placoderms. It was closely related to the giant Dunkleosteus, but differed from that genus in size, in possessing a distinctive tuberculated bone ornament, a differently shaped nuchal plate and a more zig-zagging course of the sutures of the skull roof.

Species of Eastmanosteus had powerful jaws with sharp cutting edges and were likely active predators. Fossils have been found in many parts of the world in marine sediments dating from the Middle to Late Devonian. They were medium-to-large fish, with specimens E. pustulosus and E. licharevi approaching a total length of 3 metres. Complete exoskeletons with soft-tissue traces of E. calliaspis from Australia make this one of the best known dunkleosteids.

Phylogeny
Eastmanosteus and its relative Dunkleosteus belong to the family Dunkleosteidae. The phylogeny of Eastmanosteus can be shown in the cladogram below:

Alternatively, the subsequent 2016 Zhu et al. study using a larger morphological dataset recovered Panxiosteidae well outside of Dunkleosteoidea, leaving the status of Dunkleosteidae as a clade grouping separate from Dunkleosteoidea in doubt, as shown in the cladogram below:

Species

Eastmanosteus calliaspis Dennis-Bryan, 1987
From the Frasnian Gogo Formation of northwestern Western Australia. This is the best known member of the genus with many articulated skulls and trunk armours in museum collections. Evidence of muscle fibres, circulatory structures and nerve tissue have been preserved representing some of the oldest known gnathostome soft tissue. The largest known skull is 272mm in length suggesting a total body length of roughly 1.5m. It was one of the largest fish in the Gogo assemblage.  A reexamination of the family Dunkleosteidae posits the Late Emsian Xiangshuiosteus as E. calliaspis' sister taxon, and further implicates that E. calliaspis differs enough from other members of this genus to merit placement with its own genus.

E. licharevi (Obrucheva, 1956)
A poorly known species from Russia, originally described from an isolated nuchal plate from the Frasnian of Timman with additional material from the Famennian of Lipetsk.

E. lundarensis Hanke, Stewart and Lammers, 1996
A medium-sized species from the Eifelian of south-central Manitoba, Canada. One of the earliest and most completely known members of the genus.

E. magnificus (Hussakof & Bryant, 1918)
Based on a single almost complete head shield from the Late Devonian of New York State, US. Has previously been assigned to Dinichthys and Dunkleosteus.

E. pustulosus (Eastman, 1897)
This is the type species and was originally placed in the genus Dinichthys. It was a large and widely distributed form, with fossil material from the Middle-Late Devonian of the USA (Wisconsin, Iowa, Michigan, New York State) and the Frasnian of Poland.

E. yunnanensis (Wang, 1982)
Originally assigned to Dunkleosteus. From the Middle Devonian of Yunnan Province, China.

Eastmanosteus species 1 Janvier
An undescribed species based on relatively well preserved material from the Frasnian of Kerman, East Iran.

Other species
Many other species have been included within this genus based on material from Russia, Morocco, and the United States. Most of these are either indeterminate dinichthyids or are now placed in different genera.

References

Dunkleosteidae
Devonian fish of Africa
Devonian fish of Asia
Devonian fish of Australia
Devonian fish of Europe
Devonian fish of North America
Placoderms of Africa
Placoderms of Asia
Placoderms of Australia
Placoderms of Europe
Placoderms of North America
Middle Devonian fish
Late Devonian fish
Fossil taxa described in 1897
Gogo fauna
Fossils of Australia
Fossils of Russia
Fossils of Canada
Fossils of Poland
Fossils of China
Fossils of Iran
Paleontology in Yunnan
Middle Devonian genus first appearances
Late Devonian genus extinctions